Zendeh Qul (also Romanized as Zendeh Qūl; also known as Zendeh Ghūl) is a village in Kani Bazar Rural District, Khalifan District, Mahabad County, West Azerbaijan Province, Iran. At the 2006 census, its population was 208 with 27 families.

References 

Populated places in Mahabad County